F2 propagation (F2-skip) is the reflection of FM broadcasting signals off the F2 layer of the ionosphere. The phenomenon is rare compared to other forms of propagation (such as sporadic E propagation, or E-skip) but can reflect signals thousands of miles beyond their intended broadcast area, substantially farther than E-skip. F2-skip affects the upper ends of the high frequency (HF) spectrum and the low ends of the very high frequency (VHF) spectrum; only a small portion of F2's effective range overlaps frequencies used by consumer broadcast reception, also contributing to the phenomenon being rarely encountered.

Solar activity has a cycle of approximately 11 years. During this period, sunspot activity rises to a peak and gradually falls again to a low level. When sunspot activity increases, the reflecting capabilities of the F1 layer surrounding earth enable high frequency short-wave communications. During the daytime when sunspot activity is at a maximum, the F2 layer can become intensely ionized due to radiation from the sun. When solar activity is sufficiently high, the MUF (Maximum Usable Frequency) rises, hence the ionisation density is sufficient to reflect signals well into the 30-60 MHz VHF spectrum. Since the MUF progressively increases, F2 reception on lower frequencies can indicate potential low band 45-55 MHz VHF TV as well as VHF amateur radio paths. A rising MUF will initially affect the 27 MHz CB band, and the amateur 28 MHz 10 meters band before reaching 45-55 MHz TV and the 6 meters amateur band. The F2 MUF generally increases at a slower rate compared to the Es MUF.

A single-hop F2 signal will usually be around  minimum.

Since F2 reception is directly related to radiation from the Sun on both a daily basis and in relation to the sunspot cycle, it follows that for optimum reception the centre of the signal path will be roughly at midday. Outside a solar maximum it can still occur somewhat regularly within about 15 to 20 degrees from the geomagnetic equator, with the peak generally being in spring time. However, this type of F2 propagation is mostly specifically referred to as TEP (Trans Equatorial Propagation) to differentiate it from the less common mid latitude F2 propagation.

The F2 layer tends to predominantly propagate signals below 30 MHz (HF) during a solar minimum, which includes the 27 MHz CB radio, and 28 MHz 10-meter amateur radio band. During a solar maximum, television, amateur radio signals, private land mobile, and other services in the 30-60 MHz VHF spectrum are also propagated over considerable distances. In North America, F2 is most likely to only affect VHF TV channel 2, in Europe and middle east channel E2 and E3 (and the now deprecated channel itA) and in eastern Europe channel R1.

Television pictures propagated via F2 tend to suffer from characteristic ghosting and smearing, although they are mostly stronger and more stable than double hop Sporadic E signal. Picture degradation and signal strength attenuation increases with each subsequent F2 hop.

Notable F2 DX receptions
 In November 1938, 405-line video from the BBC Alexandra Palace television station (London, England) on channel B1 (45.0 MHz) was received in New York, USA.
 In October 1979, Anthony Mann (Perth, Western Australia) received 48.25 MHz audio and 51.75 MHz video from the Holme Moss BBC channel B2 television transmitter. This F2 reception is a world record for reception from a BBC 405-line channel B2 transmitter.
 During October to December 1979, United Kingdom DXers Roger Bunney (Hampshire), Hugh Cocks (Sussex), Mike Allmark (Leeds), and Ray Davies (Norwich) all received viewable television pictures from Australian channel TVQ 0 Brisbane (46.26 MHz) via multi-hop F2 propagation.
This BBC B1 reception was also recorded on to audio tape. He has also received Dubai's DCRTV 48.25 MHz video on November 23, 1991, in the same place.
 On April 18, 2014, the DXer HughTVDX, received Canal 2 Posada (Misiones) - Argentina (55.251 MHz video) in southern Portugal about 8700 km away

See also
 Federal Standard 1037C
 MW DX
 Skywave
 Radio propagation
 clear-channel station

References

External links 
 TV/FM Antenna Locator
 Worldwide TV/FM DX Association
 Worldwide TV/FM DX Association Forums
 Band 1 TVDX from Europe, North African and Middle East FMDX database
 British FM & TV Circle, Home of FM & TV DX in the UK
 Girard Westerberg's page, including a live DX webcam
 Mike's TV and FM DX Page since 1999
 Todd Emslie's TV FM DX Page
 Jeff Kadet's TV DX Page
 
 FM DX Italy The official FM & TV DX website in Italy
 fmdxITALY Home of FM & TV DX in Italy
 FMLIST is a non-commercial worldwide database of FM stations, including a bandscan and logbook tool (FMINFO/myFM)
 Mixture.fr AM/FM/DAB database for France
 MeteorComm Meteor Burst Technology used for Data Communication
 FMSCAN reception prediction of FM, TV, MW, SW stations (also use the expert options for better results)
 Herman Wijnants' FMDX pages
 TV/FM Skip Log
 qth.net Mailing Lists for Radio, Television, Amateur and other related information for Enthusiasts.
 North American TV Logo Gallery
  VHF DXing - From Fort Walton Beach, Florida
 Radio-info.com DX and Reception
 FM DX RDS LogBook Software

Ionosphere
Radio frequency propagation

th:ทีวีดีเอกซ์